Dhanpal Ganesh (born 13 June 1994) is an Indian professional footballer who plays as a midfielder for Chennaiyin in the Indian Super League.

Career

Pune
Born in Chennai, Tamil Nadu, Ganesh became the first player from the Pune Academy to sign with the first-team at Pune in July 2011. He made his professional debut for the club on 18 December 2011 against Churchill Brothers at the Fatorda Stadium; he came on in the 94th minute for Othallo Tabia as Pune won the match 2–0. He made his first start for the club in the I-League on 18 April 2012 against Salgaocar in a 2–0.

Pailan Arrows (loan)
For the 2012–13 I-League season Ganesh was loaned out to the Pailan Arrows for the whole season. He made his debut for the Arrows on 28 August 2012 in the Durand Cup against Air India in which he started as Arrows drew the match 1–1. He then made his league debut for Pailan Arrows on the league opening day against Mumbai on 6 October 2013. He came on as an 87th-minute substitute for Holicharan Narzary as the Arrows won the match 3–2.

Return to Pune
After a season with the Arrows, Dhanpal was back at Pune for the 2013-14 season. He would make 12 appearances in the league and would feature regularly in the starting line-up in the second half of the season. He kept up his good form and made his debut in the AFC Champions League in a qualifier against Hanoi T&T in a 0–3 loss. Dhanpal would score his first senior goal for Pune in the opening game of Pune's 2014 Durand Cup campaign in a 3–0 win over Churchill Brothers. He started in the first ever Pune Derby against Bharat FC but was sent-off following off the ball challenge on the 88th minute of the game which ended 1-1.

Chennaiyin
In July 2015 Ganesh was drafted to play for Chennaiyin in the 2015 Indian Super League.

International
On 20 June 2012 it was confirmed that Ganesh would play for the India U23 team during 2013 AFC U-22 Asian Cup qualification. He made his debut for the under-23 team on 23 June 2012 against Lebanon U23 in the 2013 AFC U-23 Asian Cup qualifiers in which India won 5–2.
He made his senior debut on 17 March 2015 against Nepal, coming on as a substitute for Eugeneson Lyngdoh.

Career statistics

Honours

Club

Chennaiyin
 Indian Super League: 2015 Champions
 Indian Super League: 2017-18 Champions

References

External links 
 Pune Football Club Profile.

1994 births
Living people
Footballers from Chennai
Indian footballers
Pune FC players
Indian Arrows players
Chennaiyin FC players
Association football midfielders
I-League players
India youth international footballers
Indian Super League players